Hamray or Hamre is a village in the Pattan tehsil of Baramulla district in Jammu and Kashmir, India, located 7 km  away from Pattan town along the Srinagar- Baramulla highway.

Establishments and institutions 
There are various Govt. and private schools of varied levels from Kindergarten to High school in this village, where not only children of this village but also from other neighbouring villages get education.

Hamre railway station 
Hamre railway station is situated in the outskirts of Hamre and Rinjee village. It lies on Northern Railway Network Zone of Indian Railways. It is the third last station of Northern Railway Network Zone.

Religion
People of Hamre follow Sunni Islam. Religious education is imparted through madrassas in the morning and evening.

References

Villages in Baramulla district